Mondo was a line of fruit-flavored beverages marketed primarily towards children. Manufactured and distributed by the Jel Sert Company, production of Mondo began in 1991 and ended in 2021 or 2022. Mondo resembled both Kool-Aid Bursts and the discontinued Betty Crocker Squeezit. The product, referred to as Mondo Fruit Squeezers by the company, was sold in six-packs of 6.75 oz recyclable plastic containers.

Flavors

JelSert currently produces 11 flavors of Mondo. Of these 11 flavors only 8 are advertised on their website.

 Chillin' Cherry
 Cherry Berry*
 Citrus Punch*
 Global Grape
 Kiwi Strawberry Splash
 Legendary Berry
 Outstanding Orange
 Pineapple Punch
 Primo Punch
 Sour Green Apple*
 Watermelon Wipeout
*Item is not currently listed on Mondo's Website.

References

External links
 Mondo page at JelSert

Non-alcoholic drinks